King of the Forest Rangers (1946) is a Republic film serial.

Cast
Larry Thompson as Forest Ranger Captain Steve King
Helen Talbot as Marion Brennan
Stuart Hamblen as Prof Carver
Anthony Warde as Burt Spear
LeRoy Mason as "Flush" Haliday
Scott Elliott as Andrews/Bryan/Merkle/Sands

Production
King of the Forest Rangers was budgeted at $134,948 although the final negative cost was $137,320 (a $2,372, or 1.8%, overspend). It was the cheapest Republic serial of 1946.

It was filmed between 27 September and 25 October 1945. The serial's production number was 1595.

Republic liked calling their heroes "King" in order to use the title "King of..." The studio had found success with this naming scheme following the adaptation of Zane Grey's King of the Royal Mounted.

Stunts
Tom Steele as Forest Ranger Captain Steve King (doubling Larry Thompson)
David Sharpe as Prof Carver (doubling Stuart Hamblen)
Dale Van Sickel as Burt Spear (doubling Anthony Warde)
Carey Loftin
Eddie Parker
Ken Terrell
Sailor Vincent
Bud Wolfe
Joe Yrigoyen

Special effects
Special effects created by the Lydecker brothers.

Release

Theatrical
King of the Forest Rangers''' official release date is 27 April 1946, although this is actually the date the sixth chapter was made available to film exchanges.

Television
In the early 1950s, King of the Forest Rangers'' was one of fourteen Republic serials edited into a television series. It was broadcast in six 26½-minute episodes.

Chapter titles
 The Mystery of the Towers (20min)
 Shattered Evidence (13min 20s)
 Terror by Night (13min 20s)
 Deluge of Destruction (13min 20s)
 Pursuit into Peril (13min 20s)
 Brink of Doom (13min 20s)
 Design for Murder (13min 20s)
 The Flying Coffin (13min 20s) - a re-cap chapter
 S.O.S. Ranger (13min 20s)
 The Death Detector (13min 20s)
 The Flaming Pit (13min 20s)
 Tower of Vengeance (13min 20s)
Source:

See also
 List of film serials by year
 List of film serials by studio

References

External links
 
 

1946 films
1940s English-language films
American black-and-white films
Republic Pictures film serials
Films directed by Spencer Gordon Bennet
Films directed by Fred C. Brannon
American adventure films
1946 adventure films
1940s American films